Robab Moheb, born 1953 in Iran, is a Swedish–Iranian poet, author and translator.

Moheb studied sociology in Iran and has received a masters degree in pedagogical sciences in Sweden, where she has lived since 1992. Her debut as an author came in 1979 with a collection of short stories. In 2008 she published her first translations of Swedish poetry into Persian in collaboration with Swedish poets Kristina Lugn, Ida Börjel and Katarina Grippenberg.

Bibliography (selection)
 bâ dàsthâye por be xâne bâzmigàrdim, Negah Press, Iran, 1979.
 pàriye kuchake hâns, Lajvard Press, Iran, 2002.
 pàs àz in àgàr àz tàrs xâli bemânàm, Lajvard Press, Iran, 2005
 pâvàràghi, Baran Press, Stockholm, Sweden, 2008.

References

20th-century Iranian poets
1953 births
Living people
21st-century Iranian poets